Basic Instinct 2 (also known as Basic Instinct 2: Risk Addiction) is a 2006 erotic thriller film and the sequel to 1992's Basic Instinct. The film was directed by Michael Caton-Jones and produced by Mario Kassar, Joel B. Michaels, and Andrew G. Vajna. The screenplay was by Leora Barish and Henry Bean. It stars Sharon Stone, who reprises her role of crime mystery author Catherine Tramell (from the original Basic Instinct), and David Morrissey. The film is an international co-production of German, British, American, and Spanish producers.

The film follows novelist and suspected serial killer Catherine Tramell, who is once again in trouble with the authorities, this time in London. Now Scotland Yard (Greater London's Metropolitan Police Service) appoints psychiatrist Dr. Michael Glass to evaluate her after. As with SFPD Detective Nick Curran in the first film, Dr. Glass becomes a victim of Tramell's psychological manipulation.

After being in development limbo for several years, the sequel film was finally shot in London from April to August 2005, and was released on 31 March 2006. Following numerous cuts, it was released with an R rating for "strong sexuality, nudity, violence, language, and some drug content". Unlike its predecessor, the film received extremely negative reviews and flopped at the box office.

Plot 
Set in London, the film opens with American best-selling author Catherine Tramell in a speeding car with her companion, famous English football star Kevin Franks. Tramell takes Franks's hand and begins masturbating herself with it, simultaneously increasing her vehicle's speed, but the semi-unconscious Franks is seemingly unaware of what is happening. At the point of orgasm, Tramell veers off the road and crashes into the West India Docks in Canary Wharf on the River Thames. She attempts to save Franks, but while being questioned later by the police, she says, "When it came down to it, I guess my life was more important to me than his."

Tramell's interrogator, Scotland Yard Detective Superintendent Roy Washburn, notes that D-tubocurarine (DTC), a neuromuscular blocking agent used to relax muscles during general anaesthesia for medical surgery, was found in her car and in her companion's body, and the companion was not breathing when the crash occurred (according to the autopsy), and that "Dicky Pep" said that he sold Tramell "15 milliliters of DTC last Thursday". Tramell counters by saying Dicky Pep must be lying because, "you've got him on some other charge and he's trying to deal his way out, if he even exists".

Tramell begins therapy sessions with Dr. Michael Glass, who has conducted a court-ordered psychiatric examination and given testimony in her case. Dr. Glass strongly suspects Tramell is a narcissist, unable to differentiate between right and wrong. Tramell begins to manipulate Glass, who becomes increasingly frustrated and intrigued by her. Meanwhile, the journalist boyfriend of Glass's ex-wife, who was writing a story criticising Glass, is found strangled to death. More murders begin to surface around Dr. Glass, including his own ex-wife, as his obsession with Tramell grows; when his career and life are threatened, he begins to suspect that Tramell is really committing the murders and attempting to frame him for them.  Glass increasingly cannot distinguish himself between right and wrong, and the London police begin to suspect him. He confronts Tramell at her apartment, where they have passionate sex. Tramell gives Glass a copy of the draft of her next novel, titled The Analyst. After reading it, he realises that Tramell has novelised most of the recent events, with Glass and herself as characters. A character based on Glass's female colleague, Dr. Milena Gardosh, is depicted as the next murder victim in the novel.

Glass runs to Dr. Gardosh's apartment to warn her, finding Tramell already there. Gardosh informs him that he is no longer in charge of Tramell's therapy and that his license will be revoked. He and Gardosh struggle, and she is knocked unconscious. Tramell then threatens Glass with a gun she carries, but Glass confiscates it from her. When Detective Superintendent Washburn arrives at the scene, Tramell manipulates Dr. Glass into shooting him.

In the final scene, Tramell visits Dr. Glass, now institutionalised at a local mental hospital, and informs him that the novel has become a best seller. Tramell claims that she manipulated Glass into committing all those murders, and flashbacks are shown of Glass committing the murders. Tramell leaves with a smirk on her face, while Glass continues to sit silently in his wheelchair.

Cast 
 Sharon Stone as Catherine Tramell
 David Morrissey as Dr. Michael Glass
 Charlotte Rampling as Dr. Milena Gardosh
 David Thewlis as Roy Washburn
 Indira Varma as Denise Glass
 Flora Montgomery as Michelle Broadwin
 Heathcote Williams as Dr. Jakob Gerst
 Hugh Dancy as Adam Towers
 Anne Caillon as Laney Ward
 Iain Robertson as Peter Ristedes
 Stan Collymore as Kevin Franks
 Kata Dobó as Magda
 Jan Chappell as Angela

Development 
MGM had planned to produce the sequel for release in 2002, but announced in 2001 that they would no longer be making the film. On the same day of the announcement, Sharon Stone filed a lawsuit against the movie's producers Andrew G. Vajna and Mario Kassar, claiming she was guaranteed "at least $14 million for her commitment to the sequel, even if the movie never got made" and "as much as 15 percent of gross receipts if the film were released." Die Hard director John McTiernan had been attached to direct the film. He said that he wanted Benjamin Bratt to play the male lead, but that Sharon Shone did not approve. He wanted to rewrite the character as a Latin-American psychiatrist working in an emergency room, who is "seduced not by just the woman but by wealth and luxury he'd never before been exposed to." Robert Downey Jr. was offered the role of Dr. Michael Glass but he declined. Aaron Eckhart had also been in consideration to co-star with Stone. Other directors considered included David Cronenberg and Lee Tamahori. In 2004, the producers settled the lawsuit with Stone by agreeing to make the movie.

Production 
Michael Caton-Jones signed on to direct the film, later stating, "I was completely broke and had to take anything that came in. Basic Instinct 2 was this poisoned chalice that had been passed around and eventually it arrived at my door." David Morrissey was cast in the co-starring role as the psychiatrist who analyzes Catherine Tramell. He said he "loved the script" and "immediately hit it off" with Sharon Stone "and it remained that way through the filming." The film was threatened with an NC-17 rating by the MPAA and went through cuts to achieve an R rating.

Reception

Critical response 
On Rotten Tomatoes, the film has an approval rating of 6% based on 156 reviews, with average rating of 3.02/10. The site's critical consensus reads, "Unable to match the suspense and titilation of its predecessor, Basic Instinct 2 boasts a plot so ludicrous and predictable it borders on so-bad-it's-good." On Metacritic, the film has a score of 26 out of 100 based on 33 critics, indicating "generally unfavorable reviews". Audiences polled by CinemaScore gave the film an average grade of "C" on an A+ to F scale.

BBC film critic Mark Kermode was one of the few critics to give it a positive review. Roger Ebert gave the film 1.5 stars out of a possible 4, calling it "godawful," but not boring. He said, "The Catherine Tramell role cannot be played well, but Sharon Stone can play it badly better than any other actress alive."

At the 27th Golden Raspberry Awards, the film (dubbed by the ceremony as "Basically, It Stinks, Too") won four Razzies for Worst Picture, Worst Actress (Sharon Stone), Worst Prequel or Sequel, and Worst Screenplay (Leora Barish and Henry Bean). It also earned nominations for Worst Director (Michael Caton-Jones), Worst Supporting Actor (David Thewlis), and Worst Screen Couple (Sharon Stone's lopsided breasts). The film also received three nominations at the 2006 Stinkers Bad Movie Awards: Worst Picture, Worst Actress (Sharon Stone), and Worst Sequel.

Michael Caton-Jones recalled later that making the movie was "a painful experience" and said, "the reaction I couldn’t care less about. It was the experience of making it: it was horrible. And I knew before I started that it wasn't going to be a particularly good film. Which is a very, very painful thing." Interviewed by Empire magazine, he said: "I remember coldly thinking 'this is the worst filmmaking experience of my life' at the time, but my memory of it is the good thing. We tried to give it a look and I was very happy with it. I had a difficult time with Sharon [Stone], but I had a great time with all the other actors."

David Morrissey said:  "I thought it was a great script. I know it didn't turn out to be the greatest film in the world, but I've never regretted any job I've gone into. You learn from all your work, but the knocks that you take whether it be from journalist, reviews, etc. all serve to make you stronger."

Box office 
The film was a noteworthy failure at the box office; it grossed only $3,201,420 (averaging just $2,203 per theater) in its first weekend of release in the United States. This placed it a poor 10th in top gross, against such competition as Ice Age: The Meltdown (opening the same weekend), V for Vendetta, and Inside Man. As low as the opening weekend was, the second-week drop-off was just under 70% to just $1,017,607, averaging a mere $700 per theatre, nearly the worst of the year. (Only Harsh Times and Eragon dropped off more.) In the end, the film was in theatres for only 17 days before Sony decided to stop tracking its progress, and finished with a domestic gross of only $5,971,336.

The film found more success outside the United States, earning $32,658,142, giving Basic Instinct 2 a worldwide theatrical gross of $38,629,478.

Moviefone ranked the film as number 16 on its Top 25 Box Office Bombs of All Time.

Awards and nominations

Cancelled sequel 
Plans for a third film were scrapped due to the film's poor box-office reception, but in April 2006, Stone said she would be interested in directing a potential third installment.

References

External links 

 
 
 
 
 

2006 films
2006 psychological thriller films
2000s American films
2000s English-language films
2000s erotic thriller films
2000s mystery thriller films
American erotic thriller films
American mystery thriller films
American psychological thriller films
American sequel films
British erotic thriller films
British mystery thriller films
British psychological thriller films
British sequel films
C2 Pictures films
English-language German films
English-language Spanish films
Erotic mystery films
Films about narcissism
Films about sexuality
Films about writers
Films directed by Michael Caton-Jones
Films produced by Andrew G. Vajna
Films scored by John Murphy (composer)
Films set in London
Films shot at Pinewood Studios
Films shot in London
Films shot in Surrey
German erotic thriller films
German mystery thriller films
German psychological thriller films
German sequel films
Golden Raspberry Award winning films
Spanish erotic thriller films
Spanish mystery thriller films
Spanish sequel films
2000s British films
2000s German films
2000s Spanish films
Metro-Goldwyn-Mayer films